Daniel Enrique "Cua cuá" Hormazábal Silva (January 6, 1931 – April 18, 1999) was a Chilean footballer, born in Santiago, who played as a right winger for Colo-Colo and the Chile national football team.

Playing career 
He played a significant role at the 1955 and 1956 editions of the Copa America where Chile would finish as runners-ups.

Managerial career
From 1969 to 1970, he managed Colo-Colo for 27 matches. In 1976, he managed Coquimbo Unido in the Chilean Segunda División along with José Sulantay as assistant. In 1979 he managed Santiago Morning.

Personal life
His nickname, Cua Cua, was due to the price of the taxi to go home: forty cents ("Cuarenta centavos" in Spanish).

Honors 
Colo-Colo
Chilean League: 1956, 1960, 1963

References

External links
Ficha Técnica: Enrique Hormazabal

1999 deaths
1931 births
Footballers from Santiago
Chilean footballers
Chile international footballers
Santiago Morning footballers
Colo-Colo footballers
Chilean Primera División players
Chilean people of Basque descent
Association football midfielders
Chilean football managers
Colo-Colo managers
Coquimbo Unido managers
Ñublense managers
Chilean Primera División managers
Primera B de Chile managers
People from Santiago